Camp Release State Monument is located on the edge of Montevideo, Minnesota, United States, just off Highway 212 in Lac qui Parle County, in the 6-acre Camp Release State Memorial Wayside.  The Camp Release Monument stands as a reminder of Minnesota's early state history. The Minnesota River Valley and Montevideo were important sites in the Dakota War of 1862. 

On September 26. 1862, a few days after the U.S. victory at the Battle of Wood Lake, 269 prisoners who had been taken captive during the conflict were released to Colonel Henry Hastings Sibley at a spot that became known as Camp Release, which was located on a bluff overlooking the valley and the present-day site of Montevideo. 

The Camp Release State Monument was the sixth of 23 state monuments erected by the Minnesota legislature between 1873 and 1929. It was the first property added to the state park system and was listed on the National Register of Historic Places in 1973.

Monument dedication and inscription 
The Camp Release Monument was dedicated on July 4, 1894, commemorating "the surrender here of a large body of Indians, and the release of 269 captives, most of them women and children" on September 26, 1862. 

The inscription on the northern side of the monument states that the release was "The result mainly of the signal victory over the hostile Sioux at Wood Lake by Minnesota troops under command of General Henry H. Sibley, all being incidents of the Great Sioux Indian Massacre."

The southern side of the monument simply says "Camp Release".

The other two sides of the 51-foot granite monument are inscribed with information about:

 The dates of battles that took place along the Minnesota River during the conflict (Eastern side)
 Erection of the monument by the State of Minnesota in accordance with an act of Legislature approved on April 11, 1893 and supervised by named committee members (Western side)

Monument marker 
Erected in 1989 by the Minnesota Historical Society, the Camp Release Marker states that on September 26, 1862, "91 whites and about 150 mixed-blood captives, some of who had been captives of the Dakota Indians for over a month" were released. 

It goes on to state, "In the next few days, additional captives were freed, bringing the total to 107 whites and 162 mixed-bloods – 269 in all."

The marker also goes on to acknowledge the role played by the Dakota "peace faction":

The Camp Release Marker concludes by explaining that the Dakota who "surrendered" included members of the peace faction:Many of the peace faction who surrendered to Sibley's army at Camp Release were among the Dakota exiled from Minnesota the following year.The Minnesota Historical Society has since revised the estimated total of captives released at Camp Release to 285.

See also
 National Register of Historic Places listings in Lac qui Parle County, Minnesota

References

External links

1894 establishments in Minnesota
1894 sculptures
Buildings and structures completed in 1894
Buildings and structures in Lac qui Parle County, Minnesota
Dakota War of 1862
Granite sculptures in Minnesota
Monuments and memorials on the National Register of Historic Places in Minnesota
Obelisks in the United States
Protected areas of Lac qui Parle County, Minnesota
Protected areas established in 1894
National Register of Historic Places in Lac qui Parle County, Minnesota
Temporary populated places on the National Register of Historic Places